California Country Park is a  country park covering Long Moor at California in the north of the civil parish of Finchampstead in the English county of Berkshire. It consists of lowland heath and bogland, including Longmoor Bog, a Site of Special Scientific Interest (SSSI) and Local Nature Reserve.  The park is managed by Wokingham Borough Council and is open every day throughout the year.

Geography

The site is 150 acres in size and features a six-acre lake.

The park features a ferruginous swamp, Longmoor Bog, caused by a bacterium that deposits rust-coloured iron hydroxide.

History

In 1931, it was established as an amusement park and Zoo by Alfred Cartilage and was called 'California in England'. Alfred built the park so that he could use his Charabanc company, based in Teddington, London, to take parties of people from London to the countryside.  The miniature railway was initially laid out to 10.25" but was soon changed to 18" and this lasted until the outbreak of the second world war when the park closed and all the buildings were used for the manufacture of munitions, mostly for the aircraft industry. Alfred reopened the park after the war and set about developing the rides many of which were designed and built onsite, including the famous Snake Train. The railway was reestablished as 18" gauge using a petrol powered  locomotive. His son, Norman took over in the early 1950s and continued the development of the site . 
At this time the original miniature railway terminus station was moved to the outer north-western edge of the extended play and rides area. The track was extended across the bog and had a point installed with the intention of constructing a loop. Trackwork was never completed beyond the apex of the loop and it is here that after the park closed the last loco on the line was run off into the swamp. It is probably still there. 
The cleared area between the railway and the original rides was developed with extra rides. There was a small galloping horses roundabout, a full size 'chairoplane', climbing frame, swing boats and a concrete oval track. The latter was initially intended for petrol driven go-karts but these were a maintenance nightmare and were soon replaced by children's pedal cars of the Austin J40 and Pathfinder type.
The removal of the original station opened up access to a further area of scrub which was cleared to provide a site for a circus which operated each summer for several years. The Art Deco main building, built around 1937, included a famous sprung glass floored ballroom  over the restaurant and featured a full calendar of dances often 'with star turns' .  This structure was destroyed by fire in 1976.

From the 1930s to the 1950s the park was home to a speedway track, where local speedway team the 'California Poppies' competed on the dirt track laid out in a remote corner of the estate.

In the early 1960s the amusement business was failing and the site obtained new owners who turned it into a holiday camp. Caravan and camping facilities are still available on site at the California Chalet and Touring Park but the main part of the original amusement area is within the country park and now largely overgrown.

Fauna

The park has the following animals

Birds

Cormorant
Canada goose
Mallard
Coot
Moorhen
Swan
Egyptian goose

Invertebrates

Bog bush cricket
Common Copper Butterfly
Dragonfly
Damselfly

Reptiles
Vipera berus

Amphibian
Palmate newt

Flora

The park has the following flora:

Trees
Alnus glutinosa
Rowan
Quercus robur
Hazel
Aspen

Plants

Bryophyte
Sphagnum

Lichen
Peltigera membranacea

Facilities
As well as offering walks and wildlife watching, especially around Longmoor Lake, there is a cafe, summer paddling pool, toddler swings and an adventure play area. A 5k parkrun started on 23 February 2019 and takes place every Saturday at 9.00am.

See also
List of Sites of Special Scientific Interest in Berkshire

References

External links

 California Country Park
 Defunct speedway tracks - California Speedway

Country parks in Berkshire
Borough of Wokingham
Sites of Special Scientific Interest in Berkshire
Local Nature Reserves in Berkshire